Broken-backed war theory is a form of conflict that could happen after a massive nuclear exchange. 
Assuming that all participants have not been annihilated, there may arise a scenario unique to military strategy and theory, one in which all or some of the parties involved strive to continue fighting until the other side is completely defeated.

Origin of the phrase 
Broken-backed war theory was first formally elaborated on in the 1952 British Defence White Paper, to describe what would presumably happen after a major nuclear exchange. The American "New Look Strategy of 1953/54" utterly rejected the notion of broken-backed war.  They dropped the term from the 1955 white paper, and the phrase has since faded from common usage.

Commentary 
Klaus Knorr purported that in a broken-backed war scenario, only military weapons and vehicles on hand prior to the sustained hostilities would be of use, as the economic potential of both sides would be, at least in theory, utterly shattered:  

Herman Kahn, in his tome On Thermonuclear War, posited that a broken-backed war is implausible, because one side would likely absorb vastly more damage than its opposition. As he was writing in the late 1950s, when the nuclear arsenals of the Soviet Union and the United States numbered in the tens of thousands, the validity of this statement in the modern war can be called into question.

The nuclear strategist Bernard Brodie argued that this form of conflict may be impractical simply because it is almost impossible to plan for. His writings on the subject came before the advent of counter-force doctrine, and during a time of nuclear plenty, when it was safe to assume that a nuclear exchange would render a nation's industry useless.

During the Cold War, Colonel Virgil Ney hypothesized that a nuclear exchange alone would not be enough to defeat the Soviet Union, and he argued for a modest construction of underground facilities and infrastructure.

In popular culture
In the novel, Final Blackout by L. Ron Hubbard, the conflict between the survivors of London and the United States has been characterized as a broken-backed war by some critics.

The table-top role-playing game Twilight: 2000 released by Game Designers' Workshop in 1984 entails a broken-backed war; in the aftermath of a nuclear exchange in 1997, by 2000, Warsaw Pact and NATO forces are still fighting for a decisive victory in Europe and elsewhere with dwindling conventional arms and munitions.

References

Nuclear warfare